Lake Tahoe–Nevada State Park is a state park comprising multiple management units and public recreation areas on the northeast shores of Lake Tahoe in the U.S. state of Nevada. The Marlette Lake Water System, which is listed on the National Register of Historic Places and as a National Historic Civil Engineering Landmark, lies within park boundaries.

Park units

Sand Harbor
Sand Harbor features a large sandy beach, picnicking facilities, nature trail, boat launch, and visitors center and is the site of the Lake Tahoe Shakespeare Festival.

Cave Rock
Cave Rock is a day-use area along U.S. 50 with boat launch, picnic areas, and sandy beach.

Spooner Lake
Spooner Lake is located near the intersection of U.S. Route 50 and State Route 28 at "Spooner Summit." The unit's  are used for hiking, picnicking, fishing, and wildlife viewing. The site is the primary starting point for the Marlette/Hobart Backcountry trails and the main vehicle entrance to both areas. Snow Valley Peak may be reached by hiking along North Canyon Creek from Spooner Lake north almost to Marlett Lake and then east to the summit.

Marlette/Hobart backcountry
Among the area's multiple trails are the Flume Trail, which has views of Lake Tahoe, and a portion of the Tahoe Rim Trail. The area encompasses Marlette Lake and Hobart Reservoir, which were created to feed the Marlette Lake Water System during the area's early mining and logging years. Remnants of abandoned mills can be seen. Two rustic cabins and several backpacking campsites provide overnight amenities.

Highway 28 corridor
The park areas along Nevada State Route 28 cover  that include Hidden Beach, a secluded sandy beach just south of Incline Village accessible by trail or water, and Memorial Point, a roadside park that connects by trail to Sand Harbor.

References

External links

Sand Harbor—Lake Tahoe Nevada State Park Nevada State Parks
Spooner Lake & Backcountry—Lake Tahoe Nevada State Park Nevada State Parks
Cave Rock—Lake Tahoe Nevada State Park Nevada State Parks

Lake Tahoe
State parks of Nevada
Protected areas established in 1958
1958 establishments in Nevada
Protected areas of Carson City, Nevada
Protected areas of the Sierra Nevada (United States)
Protected areas of Washoe County, Nevada